Frank Victor Shellenback (December 16, 1898 – August 17, 1969) was an American pitcher, pitching coach, and scout in Major League Baseball. As a pitcher, he was famous as an expert spitballer when the pitch was still legal in organized baseball; however, because Shellenback, then 21, was on a minor league roster when "trick pitches" was outlawed after the 1919 season, he was banned from throwing the pitch in the major leagues. As a result, Shellenback spent 19 years (1920–38) — the remainder of his active career — throwing the spitball legally in the Pacific Coast League. He won a record 296 PCL games.

Playing career
Shellenback was a born in Joplin, Missouri, the son of a machinist. When he was 11 years old, his family moved to Los Angeles, where he graduated from Hollywood High School. After attending the University of Santa Clara, he became a professional baseball player during World War I and was acquired by the Chicago White Sox at age 19 during the 1918 season. In 36 American League games during 1918–19, Shellenback won ten games and lost 15, with an earned run average of 3.06 in 217 innings pitched. 

He appeared in his last MLB game on July 5, 1919, before his contract was transferred to the Minneapolis Millers of the American Association. Although Shellenback posted a 7–3 record there, because of his minor league status, he was not included on a list of "grandfathered" spitball hurlers who would be allowed to continue to use the pitch at the major-league level. He would never again pitch in the majors, but was permitted to continue his career legally in minor league baseball.

Minneapolis sent Shellenback to the Vernon Tigers of the Pacific Coast League at the close of the 1919 campaign, and Shellenback began his long career in the circuit. He would hurl for Vernon, the Sacramento Solons, Hollywood Stars, and San Diego Padres, and win more than 20 games five times, with two 18-game and three 19-game winning seasons as well. All told, as a minor league pitcher, Shellenback won 315 games and lost 192 (for a winning percentage of .621), with an ERA of 3.55 over 4,514 innings. Shellenback's long tenure with Los Angeles-based teams even led to a brief movie career; he had roles in the comedies Fireman, Save My Child (1932) and Alibi Ike (1935). Both films starred comedian and baseball enthusiast Joe E. Brown, whose son would become known as a successful baseball executive.

Manager, coach and longtime scout
Shellenback had a long career as a manager, coach, and scout as well. In 1935, still an active pitcher, he took over the managerial reins of the Stars and moved with them to San Diego the following season. There, in 1936, he helped discover and groom one of the greatest hitters of all time, Ted Williams, who signed with the Padres as a 17-year-old pitcher-outfielder out of San Diego's Hoover High School. Williams was soon acquired by the Boston Red Sox, while Shellenback remained manager of the Padres through 1938, winning the 1937 PCL championship.

He then became a pitching coach for the St. Louis Browns (1939), Red Sox (1940–44), Detroit Tigers (1946–47), and New York Giants (1950–55), working on two pennant winners and one World Series champion with the Giants of Leo Durocher. During this time, Shellenback was elected to the Pacific Coast League Hall of Fame in 1943.

Shellenback overcame serious health setbacks (a heart attack in 1948 and an abdominal infection in 1951) to continue his coaching career. He became a Giants scout and minor league pitching instructor in 1956 and continued in that role until his death at age 70 in Newton, Massachusetts. Survivors included six children and 45 grandchildren.

References

Johnson, Lloyd, ed. The Minor League Register. Durham, North Carolina: Baseball America, 1994.

External links

 Baseball Almanac
 The Dead Ball Era
 SABR Baseball Biography Project
 

 
 
 
 

1898 births
1969 deaths
Baseball coaches from California
Baseball players from Los Angeles
Boston Red Sox coaches
Chicago White Sox players
Detroit Tigers coaches
Detroit Tigers scouts
Hollywood High School alumni
Hollywood Stars managers
Hollywood Stars players
Major League Baseball pitchers
Major League Baseball pitching coaches
Milwaukee Brewers (minor league) players
Minneapolis Millers (baseball) managers
Minneapolis Millers (baseball) players
Minor league baseball managers
New York Giants (NL) coaches
New York Giants (NL) scouts
Providence Grays (minor league) players
Sacramento Solons players
San Diego Padres (minor league) players
San Francisco Giants scouts
St. Louis Browns coaches
Sportspeople from Joplin, Missouri
Vernon Tigers players